Edward Hubbard (27 June 1906 – 1 October 1969) was an Australian cricketer. He played in four first-class matches for Queensland between 1929 and 1932.

See also
 List of Queensland first-class cricketers

References

External links
 

1906 births
1969 deaths
Australian cricketers
Queensland cricketers
Cricketers from Brisbane